Aung Thin (17 April 1927 – 25 October 2014) was a Lifetime National Literary Award-winning writer in Myanmar (Burma) known for his continuous encouraging of youth to become a righteous man.

Biography
He was born on 17 April 1927 in Taungdwingyi Township, Magway Region, British Burma.

His first article, Breaking Thayet Prison was printed in Myawaddy Magazine in 1959. He became a tutor at Rangoon University (University of Yangon) in 1962 but he refused to join Burma Socialist Programme Party. He worked for Mawlamyaing Degree College, Defence Services Academy and the University of Yangon as a lecturer in the 1960s and 1970s. 

He wrote more than 50 books on genres of ethical conducts, cultural knowledge and motivation of youth inspiration. He was awarded with lifetime National Literary Award in 2012.
 
He had spoken 200 over literature talks across not only in local but also in oversea like in Singapore etc. 

He was one of the founders of Free Funeral Service Society of Yangon together with Thukha and Kyaw Thu in 2001. He died on 25 October 2014 at San Chaung, Yangon.

References

1927 births
2014 deaths
Burmese writers
University of Yangon alumni
People from Magway Division